Chesli (also Romanized as Cheslī) is a village in Masal Rural District, in the Central District of Masal County, Gilan Province, Iran. At the 2006 census, its population was 469, in 108 families.

References 

Populated places in Masal County